Ramón J. Garay (1896–1956) was a Spanish film actor who appeared in the Cinema of Argentina in the classic era of the 1940s and 1950s. Although a familiar face of the period in films he didn't enter film until the age of 45.

He appeared in over 30 films between 1941 and his death in 1956 as a character actor, starring in films such as Al toque de clarín (1941), Buenos Aires a la vista and Al compás de tu mentira (1950), Con la música en el alma (1951), Amor a primera vista (1956) and Novia para dos (1956).

Selected filmography
 María Rosa (1946)
 El Muerto es un vivo (1953)
 The Age of Love (1954)

External links
 

1896 births
1956 deaths
Argentine male film actors
Spanish male film actors
Expatriate male actors in Argentina
Spanish expatriates in Argentina